Anding is an unincorporated community located in Yazoo County, Mississippi. It is the birthplace of quiltmaker Sarah Mary Taylor.

Anding has a zip code of 39040.

Education
Residents are a part of the Yazoo County School District, and are zoned to Yazoo County Middle School and Yazoo County High School.

References

Unincorporated communities in Yazoo County, Mississippi
Unincorporated communities in Mississippi